Gerry Dalton (c. 1935  2019) was an Irish sculptor. Dalton was born in Killinure, Ireland and moved to London in 1959. Dalton became known posthumously for the sculpture garden he created at his home on Hormead road, Paddington, London.

References 

1930s births
2019 deaths
Irish sculptors
Outsider artists
Irish emigrants to the United Kingdom
Year of birth uncertain